Baron McNair, of Gleniffer in the County of Renfrew, is a title in the Peerage of the United Kingdom. It was created on 4 August 1955 for the lawyer and judge Sir Arnold McNair. He was the first President of the European Court of Human Rights.  the title is held by his grandson, the third Baron, who succeeded his father in 1989.

Barons McNair (1955)
Arnold Duncan McNair, 1st Baron McNair (1885–1975)
Clement John McNair, 2nd Baron McNair (1915–1989)
Duncan James McNair, 3rd Baron McNair (b. 1947)

The heir presumptive is the present holder's brother Hon. William Samuel Angus McNair (b. 1958).
The heir presumptive's heir apparent, and last in line, is his son John Samuel McNair (b. 1984).

Notes

References
Kidd, Charles, Williamson, David (editors). Debrett's Peerage and Baronetage (1990 edition). New York: St Martin's Press, 1990, 

Baronies in the Peerage of the United Kingdom
Noble titles created in 1955